Ablaikhan Zhussupov (born 10 January 1997) is a Kazakhstani boxer. He competed in the men's light welterweight event at the 2016 Summer Olympics.

References

External links
 

1997 births
Living people
Kazakhstani male boxers
Olympic boxers of Kazakhstan
Boxers at the 2016 Summer Olympics
People from Abay District, East Kazakhstan
Boxers at the 2014 Summer Youth Olympics
AIBA World Boxing Championships medalists
Welterweight boxers
Youth Olympic gold medalists for Kazakhstan
Boxers at the 2020 Summer Olympics
21st-century Kazakhstani people